Calycadenia hooveri is a California species of flowering plant in the family Asteraceae known by the common name Hoover's western rosinweed. It is endemic to a short portion of the western Sierra Nevada foothills, where it grows in rocky areas in the hills along from Amador County to Madera County.

Description
Calycadenia hooveri is an annual herb producing thin, spindly stems 10 to 60 centimeters tall. The leaves are linear in shape and arranged alternately along the stem, especially on the lower part. The largest is up to 8 centimeters long. The inflorescence bears several bracts, each with a bulbous gland on it. It also bears one or more tiny, glandular flower heads, each with 1 or 2 disc florets and sometimes 1 or 2 lobed white ray florets. The fruit is an achene; those arising from the disc florets may have a pappus of scales at the tip.

References

External links
Jepson Manual Treatment - Calycadenia hooveri
United States Department of Agriculture Plants Profile
Calphotos Photo gallery, University of California

hooveri
Endemic flora of California
Plants described in 1975
Flora of the Sierra Nevada (United States)